The 2016 Ladies' National Football League, known for sponsorship reasons as the Lidl Ladies' National Football League, was a ladies' Gaelic football competition that ended on 7 May 2016. Cork were the Division 1 champions for the fourth year in a row.

Format

League structure
The 2016 Ladies' National Football League consists of four divisions - three of eight teams and one of seven. Kilkenny do not compete. Each team plays every other team in its division once. 3 points are awarded for a win and 1 for a draw. 2 points are deducted for conceding a walkover.

If two teams are level on league points, the tie-break is -
 Winners of the head-to-head game are ranked ahead
 If the head-to-head match was a draw, ranking is determined by score difference (i.e. total scored minus total conceded in all games)
 If the teams are still level, ranking is determined by the total scored

If three or more teams are level on league points, rankings are determined solely by score difference.

Finals, promotions and relegations
The top four teams in Division 1 contest the Ladies' National Football League semi-finals (first plays fourth and second plays third).

The top four teams in divisions 2, 3 and 4 contest the semi-finals of their respective divisions. The division champions are promoted.

The bottom teams in divisions 1, 2 and 3 are relegated.

Division 1

Table

Cork, Dublin, Kerry, Armagh and Galway are ranked by score difference.

Controversy 

After the final round of the Division 1 league the Ladies' Gaelic Football Association mistakenly announced that Armagh were one of the teams qualified for the semi-finals. They subsequently corrected their error and apologised. Armagh issued a statement accusing the LGFA of "total incompetence" and revealed that they had considered legal action.

Semi-finals & Final

Division 2

Table

Sligo defeated Meath in a playoff game.

Semi-finals & Final

Division 3

Table

Wexford, Leitrim and Roscommon are ranked by score difference.

Semi-finals & Final

Division 4

Table

Antrim are ranked ahead of Louth as they won the head-to-head game between the teams

Semi-finals & Final

References

National Football League
Ladies' National Football League seasons